Melchizedek III (November 2, 1872 – January 10, 1960) was a Catholicos-Patriarch of All Georgia from 1952 until his death. His full title was His Holiness and Beatitude, Archbishop of Mtskheta-Tbilisi and Catholicos-Patriarch of All Georgia.

Born as Mikheil Pkhaladze (მიხეილ ფხალაძე) in the Tiflis Governorate, Russian Empire, the future prelate received his education at the theological colleges of Tiflis, and Kazan in Russia. He then taught at various seminaries in Russia and Georgia. In 1915, Melchizedek was ordained to the priesthood. When the Georgian Orthodox Church broke free of Russian control in 1917, he returned to his homeland and, in 1922, became a priest at the Tbilisi Sioni Cathedral and then at Anchiskhati. He then served as bishop at Alaverdi (1925–27), archbishop at Sukhumi (1927–28), chief priest at the Tbilisi Church of the Transfiguration (1928–1935), metropolitan of Sukhumi and Abkhazia (1935–38), and chief priest at the Tbilisi Didube Church (1944–52).

After the death of Patriarch Callistratus, Melchizedek was elected as Catholicos-Patriarch of All Georgia in 1952. Despite pressure from the Soviet government, he was able to reopen the churches of Bodbe and Ilori during his tenure.

References

1872 births
1960 deaths
Catholicoses and Patriarchs of Georgia (country)
Eastern Orthodox Christians from Georgia (country)